Catapult were a Dutch glam rock band active between 1973 and 1979.

The band formed in the Summer of 1973 when during a holiday in the Spanish resort of Lloret de Mar, Geertjan Hessing, Erwin van Prehn, Aart Mol and Cees Bergman decided to form a band. The four were veterans of the Dutch rock scene but had achieved little success up to that time. Later that year keyboard player Michael Eschauzier joined them. The band's name was suggested by Golden Earring vocalist Barry Hay.

They released their first single, "Hit The Big Time", produced by ex Golden Earring drummer Jaap Eggermont early in 1974 and it reached no. 16 on the Dutch Singles Chart.

Keyboardist Eschauzier was replaced in April 1974 by Elmer Veerfoff. The band had several hit singles between 1974 and 1975, the most successful being "Let Your Hair Hang Down" which reached no. 5 on the Dutch Singles Chart. As glam rock became less popular Catapult's fortunes took a downturn and they split up in 1979.

The band continued to work together though, forming a production company called "Cat Music" and recording as Rubberen Robbie with some success in the Netherlands and Belgium.

Cees Bergman died at the age of 65 on 21 September 2017.

References

Musical groups from North Holland